The University of Louisiana System (UL System) is a public university system in the U.S. state of Louisiana. It enrolls more students than the other three public university systems in the state; as of 2022, it claims more than 90,500 students throughout its institutions. Its headquarters are in the Claiborne Building in Baton Rouge.

History
The system was founded in 1996.

Member institutions
The University of Louisiana System has nine member institutions:
Grambling State University main campus
Louisiana Tech University main campus
McNeese State University main campus
Nicholls State University main campus
Northwestern State University main campus
Southeastern Louisiana University main campus
University of Louisiana at Lafayette main campus
University of Louisiana at Monroe main campus
University of New Orleans main campus

Administration
The System President and CEO is Dr. Jim Henderson, former president of Northwestern State University and former chancellor of Bossier Parish Community College. Henderson was named by the Board of Supervisors for the University of Louisiana after a nationwide search. He began the role, January 1, 2016.

One of the system's former supervisors is the late Jimmy D. Long of Natchitoches, considered an authority on educational funding and innovation. The large Finance & Facilities Planning Division was headed by Nick Bruno, Vice President for Business & Finance, for five years from 2005 to 2010, whereupon Bruno was selected to serve as president of the University of Louisiana at Monroe.

Past Presidents 
  Dr. William “Bill” Junkin (1975–1986, as Executive Director)
  Dr. J. Larry Crain (1986-1988)
  Dr. David C. McCormick (1989–1991)
  Dr. James A. Caillier (1992-1999)
  Dr. Carroll Falcon (acting) (1998-1999, 2001)
  Mr. Bobby Jindal (1999–2001)
  Dr. Sally Clausen (2001-2008)
  Dr. Randy Moffett (2008-2012)
  Dr. Sandra Woodley (2013-2015).
  Dr. Dan Reneau (acting) (2015-2016)

Crain, Clausen, and Moffett had previously been President of Southeastern Louisiana University. Jindal, a future Louisiana governor, was the youngest president of the University of Louisiana system at age 28.

Naming conventions 
In 1999, the University of Southwestern Louisiana became the University of Louisiana at Lafayette and Northeast Louisiana University became the University of Louisiana at Monroe, based on legislation passed in 1995.  ULS policy requires both school's abbreviated names to include the municipality, precluding the use of "UL" alone.  In 2013, Woodley stated that the policy does not address stand-alone usage of "Louisiana" including within athletics, where usage of particular monikers and acronyms became a point of contention. Soon after, the University of Louisiana at Lafayette's athletic moniker became the "Louisiana Ragin' Cajuns."

See also

University of Louisiana (disambiguation)
List of colleges and universities in Louisiana
Harvey Peltier, Jr.

References

External links
 Official website

L